Lyca Radio is a commercial, national radio station in the centre of the United Kingdom. It broadcasts music and other content for British Asians on 1458 medium wave (from Brookmans Park transmitting station) and on DAB (Sound Digital multiplex).

History
Lyca Radio launched in 2014 after Lyca Media, the company that owns mobile operator Lycamobile, purchased Sunrise Radio and the license for frequency 1458 kHz. Sunrise was re-launched on the 963 and 972 AM frequencies.

The radio station went national in 2018. Its AM and DAB transmission covers almost the entire UK and can be received from parts of the European mainland.

Sister stations
Lyca Gold is a sister station that broadcasts on 1035 AM and is billed as the UK's first retro Asian music station. It was launched in September 2021 as a rebranding and format change from Dilse Radio.

References

External links

Radio stations in the United Kingdom
Radio stations established in 2014
2014 establishments in the United Kingdom
English-language radio stations